Joel C. Sercel (/ˈ sɛrsəl /; born 1960) is an American aerospace engineer. He is the inventor of Omnivore Thruster, a new concept of propulsion technology for in-space transportation, of Optical Mining, a technology for extracting raw materials from asteroids, of the Radiant Gas Dynamic method of lunar water harvesting, and of the Sun Flower Power Tower architecture for capturing and converting solar power into electricity to be used in polar lunar regions. , his work and studies have led to eight US patents and seventeen published applications. An asteroid, (46308) Joelsercel, was named after him.

Education 
Sercel received a Bachelor of Science in Engineering Physics from the University of Arizona in 1984. He received his PhD and master's degrees in Mechanical Engineering from the California Institute of Technology with a thesis in plasma physics applied to space propulsion.

Career
Sercel worked for fourteen years at Jet Propulsion Laboratory (1983–1997), being awarded by NASA for many advancements in space propulsion technologies, systems and space mission project management. While at JPL, he worked on the ideation of the NSTAR ion propulsion system used on the Dawn spacecraft.
He taught space engineering courses at Caltech (1993–2008). In the period 2002–2005, he was the Chief Systems Engineer of the (Transformational Satellite Communications System) project, a military satellite system commissioned by the US Air Force and worth twenty-two billion dollars. In 2016, he served in the National Academy of Science Air Force Studies Board on "The Role of Experimentation Campaigns in the Air Force Innovation Life Cycle" and in the NASA ARM Formulation Assessment and Support Team (FAST).
In 2019, Sercel acted as Founding CTO of Momentus, a technological space company based in the Silicon Valley.

Trans Astronautica Corporation 

Sercel founded TransAstronautica Corporation in 2015, converging in it his studies and inventions, with the aim to build the necessary space infrastructure for transportation and resource mining in the solar system.
Under Sercel's guidance, engineers at TranAstra are working on the following:

 Apis (Asteroid Provided In-situ Supplies) Flight Systems, the fleet of spacecraft equipped with Optical Mining technology and the Omnivore Thruster system, working as honey bees to collect and transport resources harvested in space
 Optical Mining, a technology that enables the extraction of resources in space thanks to the use of concentrated sunlight 
 Omnivore Thruster, an innovative propulsion technology which allows to use a multitude of fuel types, water included, to be used for in-space cargo transportation 
 Sutter Asteroid Survey, a new kind of telescope developed for the discovery of new asteroids in real-time and the detection of their velocity and luminosity, using the Compound Synthetic Tracking 
 Beetle Lunar Rover, an electric powered rover aimed to harvest resources on the Moon or on Mars, thanks to a special technology called Radiant Gas Dynamic (RGD) mining, which allows to mine resources avoiding the problems of the classic mechanical digging operations 
 Sun Flower Power Tower, a solar power generator, designed specifically to be used in the lunar poles, allowing to deliver megawatts of sunlight to support lunar mining operations

NASA NIAC awards
Sercel received several NASA Innovative Advanced Concepts (NIAC) Fellowships.
NIAC Phase I Awards:

 APIS (Asteroid Provided In-Situ Supplies): 100MT of Water from a Single Falcon 9
 Sutter: Breakthrough Telescope Innovation for Asteroid Survey Missions to Start a Gold Rush in Space
 Lunar-Polar Propellant Mining Outpost (LPMO): Affordable Exploration and Industrialization

NIAC Phase II Awards:

 Optical Mining of Asteroids, Moons, and Planets to Enable Sustainable Human Exploration and Space Industrialization
 Lunar Polar Propellant Mining Outpost (LPMO): A Breakthrough for Lunar Exploration & Industry

NIAC Phase III Award:

 Mini Bee Prototype to Demonstrate the Apis Mission Architecture and Optical Mining Technology

US patents 

 Systems and methods for obtaining energy in shadowed regions 
 Spacecraft propulsion devices and systems with microwave excitation 
 System and method for creating, processing, and distributing images that serve as portals enabling communication with persons who have interacted with the images 
 Authentication and validation of smartphone imagery
 Cross-talk reduction in a bidirectional optoelectronic device

Published applications 

 Space Mission Energy Management Architecture
 Systems and Methods for Adjusting the Orbit of a Payload
 Spacecraft Propulsion Devices and Systems with Microwave Excitation
 Optics and Structure for Space Applications
 Spacecraft Structures and Mechanisms
 Spacecraft Thermal and Fluid Management Systems
 Systems and Methods for Radiant Gas Dynamic Mining of Permafrost for Propellant Extraction
 System and Method for Creating, Processing, and Distributing Images That Serve as Portals Enabling Communication With Persons Who Have Interacted With the Images
 Authentication and Validation of Smartphone Imagery
 Cross Talk Reduction in a Bidirectional Optoelectronic Device
 Web Application Hybrid Structure and Methods for Building and Operating a Web Application Hybrid Structure
 Penetrometer Including a Hammer and an Automated Actuator Weight-Supported by an Anvil Through the Hammer

References 

1960 births
Living people
American aerospace engineers
University of Arizona alumni
California Institute of Technology alumni
21st-century American inventors